The John T. Rich House is a historic residence in Grantsville, Utah, United States that is listed on the National Register of Historic Places.



Description
The house is located at 275 West Clark Street and was built c.1880.
 
Its NRHP nomination asserted that it was architecturally important as one of just 11 documented surviving Italianate two story box-style houses in Utah, and the only one of those made from adobe.

The house was listed on the National Register of Historic Places in 1984.

See also

 National Register of Historic Places listings in Tooele County, Utah

References

External links

Houses on the National Register of Historic Places in Utah
Italianate architecture in Utah
Houses completed in 1880
Houses in Tooele County, Utah
National Register of Historic Places in Tooele County, Utah